The Fulton County Railroad  is a privately held short-line railroad that runs from Rochester to Argos, Indiana, where it connects with the Norfolk Southern Railway. It is a switching railroad that originally provided service to only one customer, Wilson Fertilizer and Grain in Rochester, and operates approximately 13 miles of track.

Since February 24, 2011, freight on FC infrastructure is handled by Elkhart and Western Railroad through Trackage rights. In addition to the original customer, it now also serves a scrap yard and occasional other customers.

References

External links
US Railroad Retirement Board Determination: Fulton County Railroad

Indiana railroads
Transportation in Fulton County, Indiana
Transportation in Marshall County, Indiana